Alfonso Juventino Nava Díaz (born 25 January 1952) is a Mexican politician affiliated with the Institutional Revolutionary Party.  he served as Deputy of the LIX Legislature of the Mexican Congress representing San Luis Potosí.

References

1952 births
Living people
Politicians from San Luis Potosí
Institutional Revolutionary Party politicians
People from Matehuala
Universidad Autónoma de San Luis Potosí alumni
21st-century Mexican politicians
Deputies of the LIX Legislature of Mexico
Members of the Chamber of Deputies (Mexico) for San Luis Potosí